Nizhny Uymon (Altıgı-Oymon) is a rural locality (a selo) in Ust-Koksinsky District, the Altai Republic, Russia. The population was 165 as of 2016. There are 4 streets.

Geography 
Nizhny Uymon is located 25 km southeast of Ust-Koksa (the district's administrative centre) by road. Multa and Zamulta are the nearest rural localities.

References 

Rural localities in Ust-Koksinsky District